The Tayura is a river in Irkutsk Oblast, Russia. The river is crossed by the Baikal-Amur Mainline and the interregional highway 25K-258 Ust-Kut - Severobaikalsk.

The Tayura basin is one of the areas of Russia traditionally inhabited by Evenks.

Course  

The Tayura is a right tributary of the Lena flowing to the north of Irkutsk. It has its sources in the northern part of the Lena-Angara Plateau at the confluence of the Left Tayura and Right Tayura, west of the valley of the Khanda (Kirenga). It flows northwards across mountainous territory and in its lower course roughly parallel to the Lena. Finally the Tayura meets the right bank of the Lena downstream from Ust-Kut, the  administrative center of Ust-Kutsky District,  from its mouth.

The river freezes between October and May. Summer floods are a frequent occurrence.

Flora and fauna
The vegetation of the Tayura river basin is characterized by the typical mountain taiga of the Lena-Angara Plateau. Permafrost is prevalent in the river basin.

See also
List of rivers of Russia

References

External links 
Река Таюра, Звездный, Иркутская область
Ust-Kutsky District

Rivers of Irkutsk Oblast